David O'Keeffe is a British lawyer of Irish origin.  He is Emeritus Professor of European Law, University of London.  He is Senior Counsel of Dentons international law firm.  He is a part-time European administrative law judge.

Practice

As a practitioner, he specializes in EU and WTO Trade law, State aid, antitrust, and energy law.  He litigates before the European General Court and the European Court of Justice, principally in trade cases.  Most of his cases concern anti-dumping including the Rusal Armenal case on market economy treatment and the RFA appeal on the relationship between EU anti-dumping law and WTO law.  He argues sanctions cases before the European Courts including the Dinamo Minsk litigation concerning EU sanctions against Belarus, and the pending cases OAO Minskii Avtomobilnyi Zavod  and Belaz-upravljajusaja kompanija holdinga Belaz Holding v Council. He has pleaded a number of competition cases including the Mediaset case on repayment of illegal State aid.  He occasionally litigates in other areas such as the Eurojust case, pertinent for standing issues. He acts as an arbitrator in commercial disputes concerning the application of EU law.

Administrative law judge

Since 2008, he has been chair of the Tribunal of the European University, an administrative law court established by international treaty.  He was nominated by the EU Member States.  He was previously a Member for 6 years of the conciliation board of the European Space Agency.

Academic career

He was Professor of European Law at University College London (1993–2004) and Vice-Dean of the Faculty of Laws  at a time when UCL had a number of European law scholars, including the eminent competition law expert Professor Valentine Korah, one of the founders of modern competition law and the first woman in the world to hold a Chair devoted to this subject, Margot Horspool, Basil Markesinis and Nicholas Emiliou.

He was Allen & Overy Professor of European Law and head of the Department of Law, University of Durham 1990–1993. He was a professor at the College of Europe in Bruges 1993-2006. He was a visiting professor at numerous Universities including University College Dublin, and the University of Siena.  He was law clerk to Judge T.F. O'Higgins at the European Court of Justice 1985-1990.  He was a lecturer in public international law at Leiden University under Professor Henry G. Schermers 1980-1984.

He has written a large number of academic publications on EU law.  He was an influential scholar on several areas of European Union law and his writings continue to be influential outside the EU, particularly his published General Course on European Community Law titled "The Individual and European Law", Academy of European Law, European University Institute.  He has written widely on the free movement of labor in the EU, and been involved in various policy making reports such as the Veil and Templeman Reports discussed below.

Amongst the works with which he is most associated are the classic “Mixed Agreements” (with Professor Henry G. Schermers), Kluwer, Legal Issues of the Maastricht Treaty (Chancery Law Publishing, 1994) and Legal Issues of the Amsterdam Treaty (Hart, 1999).

He was co-founding editor and joint editor of the European Foreign Affairs Review. He was a member of the editorial, advisory or scientific boards of a large number of journals specializing in EU Law including as an editor of the Common Market Law Review 1985-2005.

Public service
He has given evidence to committees of the European Parliament, most recently to the Internal Market Committee (expert report and oral evidence), to the House of Lords on EU matters and to the House of Commons on the Crossrail Act 2008. He advised the Government of The Netherlands on certain aspects of the Maastricht Treaty during the Netherlands Presidency of the EU. He has also prepared an external report for the European Ombudsman.

He was a member of the High Level Panel on the Free Movement of Workers established by the European Commission, chaired by Simone Veil.

He was Vice-Chairman of the panel chaired by Lord Templeman culminating in a Report on immigration in the UK.

Accessions to the EU

From 1990 until 2004, in connection with the Enlargement of the European Union, particularly the accession of Central and Eastern European countries to the EU, O'Keeffe was a very active and well-known speaker in countries planning to accede to the EU.  He lectured on EU law and the legal consequences of EU accession on national law at universities and other organizations particularly in Poland and Romania but also in Slovenia and Slovakia.  He also taught in other candidate countries for accession, often to audiences of civil servants.  In Finland and Sweden, he gave courses for judges and legal practitioners concerned with the impact of EU law on national legal systems.  He lectured frequently at Universities in Central and Eastern Europe like the University of Łódź where his lectures, sponsored by UNDP, were translated into Polish, edited and published by the University as a well-known book in the 1990s.  He taught regularly at the Kolegium Europejskie Warsaw, and was a guest lecturer at numerous universities and research centres in Romania, the Comenius University, and the University of Ljubljana.

Together with the Ambassador Nicholas Emiliou, he organized a ground-breaking conference in Cyprus on the accession of Cyprus to the European Union.

Awards
His activities were recognized by Romania, Slovakia Slovenia., UK.

Personal, Education; Non-EU activities

He was born in Ennis County Clare. He was educated at Clongowes Wood College, University College Dublin and Yale Law School. He was deeply involved in cultural cooperation and education projects in Southeast Europe. In Ireland, he supported all-Island initiatives such as the Irish Forum for European law of which he was a co-founder. He contributed technical background advice to some human rights aspects of the work of Brendan O'Regan. He participated in pro bono legal work, usually involving the possible impact of EU law on English public or administrative law disputes.

Notes

External links 
 Dentons 
 University College London
 College of Europe
 Durham European Law Institute

People educated at Clongowes Wood College
Alumni of University College Dublin
Yale Law School alumni
Academic staff of Leiden University
Academics of Durham University
Academic staff of the College of Europe
Academics of the University of London
Academics of University College London
People associated with University College London
Academic staff of the University of Siena
Recipients of the National Order of Merit (Romania)
Living people
People from Ennis
Year of birth missing (living people)